Ruslan Magametaliyevich Zyazikov (born 13 December 1984) is a Russian former professional football player.

Club career
He played in the Russian Football National League for FC Angusht Nazran in the 2013–14 season.

External links
 

1984 births
Sportspeople from Novosibirsk Oblast
Living people
Russian footballers
Association football forwards
FC Angusht Nazran players